The Royal Hobart Regatta is a series of aquatic competitions and displays held annually in Hobart, Tasmania, Australia and is Tasmania's oldest sporting event. The regatta began in 1838.

The event runs for three days and incorporates a public holiday observed in Southern Tasmania on the second Monday in February.

It is regularly well attended by the public in addition to local and interstate competitors 

In its beginning the Regatta was well supported by the Royal Navy. In recent years the Royal Australian Navy, sends a warship to serve as flagship for the three day spectacle. The Royal Australian Air Force, also regularly aerobatic displays using military aircraft such as the RAAF Roulettes. The Australian Army's elite Red Beret parachute regiment has previously provided sky diving displays.

Royal Hobart Regatta Association 
Governance of the Royal Hobart Regatta is executed by an association of the same name; The Royal Hobart Regatta Association.

The Association is controlled by a Board, Executive and Committee. The current president is Mr David Skegg.

History 
On 1 December 1838, the first Hobart Town Anniversary Regatta was held in Hobart, Tasmania to celebrate the Tasmanian Anniversary of the 17th-century European discovery of the island by Dutch explorer Abel Tasman, who made the first reported European sighting of the island on 24 November 1642. 

It was decided that an annual anniversary regatta should be celebrated and include the wearing of a sprig of silver wattle blossom tied with British Navy blue ribbon. A tradition instituted by Governor of Tasmania, Sir John Franklin. 

Franklin provided free food and beer for all of the spectators, and the tradition of free entry continues to this day.  The Monday was declared as a public holiday by the Governor and is now the oldest public holiday still continuing in Australia. 

Since 1879 the regatta has been held in January or February, rather than December. The regatta of 6 February 1934 was the first to be called the Royal Hobart Regatta, the title being conferred by King George V.

Cancelled Events 
It's noteworthy that the Regatta continued throughout World War I and World War II.
 1853
 1854
 1967 - Cancelled due to 'Black Tuesday' bushfire on 7 February

Significant Milestones 

 5 December 1942 - commemorated the 300th anniversary of Abel Tasman's exploration, was held on 5 December
 11 February 1955 - 80,000 people attend the Regatta in a single day a number that represents 90% of the Hobart Population
 2013 - 175th Regatta 
 11 February 2023 - Will commemorate the 185th anniversary of the event

Royal Visits 
The Royal Hobart Regatta has played host to 10 royal visits the most notably being a visit from Queen Elizabeth II and Prince Phillip in 1963 when they arrived aboard the Royal Yacht Britannia. In preparation for the occasion the main grandstand was extended and accommodated the Royals who stayed for lunch before departing for Sydney in the late afternoon.

Location 
Originally staged at Pavilion Point, the Regatta moved in 1856, to grounds near Macquarie Point known as the "Regatta Grounds" at the Queens Domain along the western side of the River Derwent. Records indicate the move was necessitated following a quarrel with Government House concerning broken beer bottles along Macquarie.

Access to the site is along McVilly Drive.

The grounds are shared with the Hobart Cenotaph, a war memorial to Tasmanian's fallen from global conflict. The primary Regatta structure on the site is the John Colville Memorial grandstand which pays tribute to members of the aquatic fraternity that fell in the first world war. A stone tablet was laid in 1942 to commemorate the 300th anniversary of the Regatta.

Events 
A plethora of events take place each year and include;

 Jet Ski & Power Boat Races
 Dragon Boat Racing
 Tug of War
 Open Water Swimming
 Sailing
 Rowing
 Wood Chopping

There is also an Ambassador quest, and the regatta always has an official attendance ceremony by the Governor.

Trans Derwent Swim 
Commencing adjacent Montagu Bay the 'Trans Derwent Swim' sees competitors cross the Derwent River Estuary, a distance of 1.5kms. In recent years a 'return' trip has been added as an extra race.

Two Bridge Kayak Race 
This paddling event sees kayakers travel from the Tasman Bridge to the Bowen Bridge before returning to the finish line at the Royal Hobart Regatta grounds. A total distance of 15kms is covered.

Wood Chopping 
Woodchopping sees axeman from across the state compete in various events and age divisions chopping and sawing blocks and wood.

Flagships 
A Flagship is a vessel used by the commanding officer of a group of naval ships and/ or the finest, largest, or most important one of a group of things.

References

External links
 Royal Hobart Regatta website

1838 establishments in Australia
Annual fairs
Annual sporting events in Australia
Fairs in Australia
Festivals in Hobart
Hobart Regatta, Royal
Recurring sporting events established in 1838
Rowing competitions in Australia
Sailing competitions in Australia
Sailing regattas
Sport in Hobart
Public holidays in Australia
Sailing in Tasmania
February observances
Boat races